Etzikom is a hamlet in Alberta, Canada within the County of Forty Mile No. 8.

Etzikom was founded in 1915. Its name comes from the Blackfoot language word for valley or coulee, referring to Etzikom Coulee.

Etzikom is also home to The Canadian National Historic Windmill Centre, a museum dedicated to windmills throughout history.

Etzikom's representative in Alberta's provincial legislature is Drew Barnes.

Demographics 
Etzikom recorded a population of 54 in the 1991 Census of Population conducted by Statistics Canada.

See also 
List of communities in Alberta
List of hamlets in Alberta

References 

County of Forty Mile No. 8
Ghost towns in Alberta
Hamlets in Alberta